The Anne Arundel County Stakes is an American Thoroughbred horse race that was revived in 2019 and is held annually in September at Laurel Park Racecourse in Laurel, Maryland. It is open to fillies age two years old and is run at five and one half furlongs on the turf.

An ungraded stakes race, it offers a purse of $100,000. The race was named in honor of Anne Arundel County, Maryland, the county in which Laurel is located. The county itself was named for Lady Anne Arundel, wife of Cecilius Calvert, 2nd Baron Baltimore and founder of the colony of Maryland. The state capital of Annapolis is located in Anne Arundel County. The race was run as the Anne Arundel Handicap from 1975–1993 and was a grade III stakes race from 1984 through 1989.
The race was formerly run at one mile (eight furlongs) on the dirt and was open to fillies ages three and up. The race was not run and was on hiatus from 2009 to 2018.

Records 

Speed record: 
 1 mile – 1:35.60 – Caught in Amber (1980) 
  miles – 1:49.20 – Essence (2004)

Most wins by a jockey:
 4 – Mario Pino (1981, 1983, 1995, 2003)

Most wins by a trainer:
 2 – Donald H. Barr (1997, 1998)
 2 – Robin L. Graham (1995, 2000)

Winners

See also 
 Anne Arundel Stakes top three finishers and starters

References

External links
 Laurel Park website

1974 establishments in Maryland
Laurel Park Racecourse
Horse races in Maryland
Recurring sporting events established in 1974